Stefano Maier (born 4 December 1992) is a German footballer. He made his 3. Liga debut for the club in October 2011, as a substitute for Kai Hesse in a 2–1 home win over Jahn Regensburg.

References

External links

1992 births
Living people
German footballers
Kickers Offenbach players
FC Viktoria Köln players
FC 08 Homburg players
3. Liga players
Regionalliga players
Association football defenders
Sportspeople from Offenbach am Main
Footballers from Hesse